William Henry Harrison High School (also known as Harrison High School) is a public senior high school located in Harrison, Ohio.  It is the only high school in the Southwest Local School District and serves as the high school for students located in Harrison Township, Crosby Township, and Whitewater Township in Hamilton County as well as a small section of Morgan Township in southwest Butler County. The district and school are ranked as "excellent"  by the Ohio Board of Education.

Demographics
Grades: 9-12
County: Hamilton County, OH
Total Students: 1,301 students
54% Male / 46% Female
Teachers: 75 teachers

Co-curricular clubs and activities
Harrison High School DECA 
Harrison High School Key Club
Harrison High School Student Council
Harrison A Cappella, DYNAMIX & Take Note
Treble Cats & Wildcat Concert Choir 
Harrison High School Jazz Band
 Harrison High School Flag Club
 Harrison High School Dance Team
 Harrison High School Creative Arts Theater (CAT).
 Harrison High School Marching Wildcats
 Harrison Color Guard returned in 2009 after a 15-year absence.
 Latin Club functions as a local chapter of both the Ohio Junior Classical League (OJCL) and National Junior Classical League (NJCL).
 Spanish Club traditionally has helped sponsor a medical clinic in Santa Lucia, Honduras . This is in cooperation with Cincinnati 's Hombro a Hombro or Shoulder to Shoulder Project through the University of Cincinnati ’s Medical School.
 Harrison Robotics Team 4521 Harrison High School hosts the FIRST Robotics Competition team 4521.
 Junior Reserve Officers' Training Corps is present as an available course, with extracurricular opportunities, at the William Henry Harrison High School.

Athletics
The Harrison Wildcats compete in the Southwest Ohio Conference (SWOC) of the Ohio High School Athletic Association. Harrison is a AAA school.

Boys
 Baseball
 Basketball
 Bowling
 Cross Country
 Football
 Golf
 Soccer
 Swimming
 Tennis
 Track and Field
 Wrestling
 Lacrosse

Girls
 Basketball
 Bowling
 Cheerleading
 Cross Country
 Dance Team
 Golf
 Soccer
 Softball
 Swimming
 Tennis
 Track and Field
 Volleyball
Wrestling

Notable alumni
Rich Franklin (UFC)
 Robert Conley (Music Producer)

References

External links
 Harrison High School Home Page
 District Website

High schools in Hamilton County, Ohio
Public high schools in Ohio
William Henry